The Mayotte sunbird (Cinnyris coquerellii) is a species of bird in the family Nectariniidae.
It is endemic to Mayotte and surrounding islets in the southeastern Comoros.
Its natural habitat is subtropical or tropical moist lowland forests.

References

 BirdLife International 2004.  Nectarinia coquerellii.   2006 IUCN Red List of Threatened Species.   Downloaded on 26 July 2007.

Mayotte sunbird
Birds of Mayotte
Mayotte sunbird
Taxonomy articles created by Polbot